Lovro Zvonarek (born 8 May 2005) is a Croatian professional footballer who plays as a midfielder for German club Bayern Munich II.

Club career

Slaven Belupo
Zvonarek joined the youth academy of Slaven Belupo in 2016, at the age of 11, coming from Mladost Prelog. He made his professional debut with Slaven in a 2–0 Prva HNL loss to Rijeka on 12 May 2021. He scored the only goal in his second appearance, a 1–0 win over Varaždin on 22 May 2021; at 16 years and 14 days old, he became the youngest ever scorer in the Prva HNL taking the record from Alen Halilović.

Bayern Munich
On 10 September 2021, Zvonarek signed a long-term contract with German club Bayern Munich for a reported fee of €1,800,000, although he remained with Slaven Belupo until the end of the 2021–22 season, he would join Bayern Munich II afterwards for further development.

He made his debut for the senior team on a friendly match against Austrian club Red Bull Salzburg in January 13, 2023. Zvonarek along with fellow Bayern Munich academy players Johannes Schenk, Tarek Buchmann, Yusuf Kabadayı and Arijon Ibrahimović started the game on the beach, all coming on as substitutes at the second half, ending as a draw 4–4.

International career
From 2019, until 2020, Zvonarek has been part of Croatia at youth international level, respectively has been part of the U15 and U16 teams and he with these teams played nine matches and scored two goals.

Career statistics

References

External links
 
 

2005 births
Living people
Sportspeople from Čakovec
Association football midfielders
Croatian footballers
Croatia youth international footballers
NK Slaven Belupo players
FC Bayern Munich footballers
FC Bayern Munich II players
Croatian Football League players
Regionalliga players
Croatian expatriate footballers
Expatriate footballers in Germany
Croatian expatriate sportspeople in Germany